The 12th National People's Congress was elected in national congressional conferences from October 2012 to February 2013 and was in session from 2013 to 2018. It succeeded the 11th National People's Congress.  It held five plenary sessions in this period, occurring around early March every year.  It was succeeded by the communing of the 13th National People's Congress.

Delegates

The 1st session 

The first session was held in March 2013. All top national posts were up for election and were filled.

The 2nd session 

The second session was held in March 2014.

The 3rd session 
The third session was held in March 2015.

The 4th session 
The fourth session was held in March 2016.

The 5th session 

The fifth session was held in March 2017.

Election results

|-
! style="background-color:#E9E9E9;text-align:left;vertical-align:top;" |Parties
! style="background-color:#E9E9E9"|Seats
|-
| style="text-align:left;" |Chinese Communist Party
| style="vertical-align:top;" |2,157
|-
| style="text-align:left;" |Minor parties, independents
| style="vertical-align:bottom;" |830
|-
|style="text-align:left;background-color:#E9E9E9"|Total
|width="30" style="text-align:right;background-color:#E9E9E9"|2,987
|}

See also 
 List of voting results of the National People's Congress of China

References

External links 

 Full coverage of the 2016 NPC & CPPCC sessions - China.org.cn
 Full coverage of the 2013 NPC & CPPCC sessions - China.org.cn
  Official website of the NPC

 
National People's Congresses
2012 in China
2013 in China
2012 elections in China
2013 elections in China